Flávio Nantes Bolsonaro (born 30 April 1981) is a Brazilian politician, lawyer and entrepreneur who is the eldest child of the 38th President of Brazil, Jair Bolsonaro.

He was a Member of the Legislative Assembly of the State of Rio de Janeiro from 2003 to 2019, and was affiliated with the Social Liberal Party.

His brothers are Carlos Bolsonaro, a member of the Rio de Janeiro City Council since 2001, and Eduardo Bolsonaro, a member of the Chamber of Deputies since 2015.

In the 2016 elections, Flavio Bolsonaro ran for mayor of Rio de Janeiro under the Social Christian Party (PSC). He participated in the first debate between the candidates, held by Grupo Bandeirantes de Comunicação. After fainting during the debate, Bolsonaro refused professional medical assistance from then socialist deputy and candidate Jandira Feghali.

In 2018, Bolsonaro was elected to the Federal Senate representing the state of Rio de Janeiro, having received 4.38 million votes (31.36%).

Bolsonaro has been accused of having ties to Rio de Janeiro's death squads.

On 25 August 2020, he tested positive for COVID-19. Less than two weeks later, he announced that he had been cured of the virus.

On 28 September 2020 O Globo reported that Bolsonaro had been indicted for graft and money laundering, citing a 300-page indictment seen by the outlet; the Rio de Janeiro public prosecutor's office issued a statement denying that any charges had been filed by that point. However, on 3 November, the prosecutor's office announced that they had asked a court on 16 October to approve indictments against Bolsonaro and sixteen others for alleged involvement between 2007 and 2018 in a scheme known as rachadinha, or pay splitting, while he was a state legislator. Following the November announcement, Bolsonaro issued a statement denying wrongdoing and expressing confidence that there was no evidence that would lead a judge to approve the charges.

In March 2021, Flávio Bolsonaro was accused of corruption after having acquired a mansion valued at 6 million reais. The purchase caused controversy because the value was considered incompatible with the senator's income. He alleges that he sold other properties, but such transactions have not yet appeared in notary offices.

References

External links
 

|-

1981 births
Flavio
Living people
People from Resende
21st-century Brazilian lawyers
Brazilian people of Italian descent
Brazilian people of Venetian descent
Brazilian people of Calabrian descent
Brazilian people of German descent
Brazilian businesspeople
Brazilian anti-communists
Conservatism in Brazil
Far-right politics in Brazil
Republicans (Brazil) politicians
Social Liberal Party (Brazil) politicians
Patriota politicians
Liberal Party (Brazil, 2006) politicians
Members of the Federal Senate (Brazil)
Children of presidents of Brazil